Fairview Mountain may refer to several places:

 Fairview Mountain (Alberta) in Alberta, Canada

 Fairview Mountain in Lewis and Clark County, Montana